Alberto Kalach (born 1960) is a Mexican architect.

Biography 
Alberto Kalach is of Jewish descent, born in Mexico City, studied architecture at the Universidad Iberoamericana, Mexico City, and completed graduate studies later at Cornell University in Ithaca. In 1981 he founded the firm "Taller de Arquitectura X" with Daniel Álvarez, with whom he worked until 2002, when Álvarez left the firm. While he continues to direct TAX, in 2002 his interests also turned to the urban planning problems of his home town, and founded the community "México: future city". He realized several joint projects, some of them with notable colleagues like Teodoro González de León, Gustavo Lipkau and Jose Castillo. His lake concepts were significant in solving existing water supply problems in Mexico City. He published several articles in national and international magazines of architecture, and participates in the "Recovering the City of Lakes"  project. Del mismo modo, ha mostrado un remarcable interés por el urbanismo, especialmente los de la Ciudad de México, por lo cual ha realizado diversos proyectos de gran escala dentro del colectivo que fundó llamado México: Ciudad Futura, donde han participado arquitectos de gran importancia como lo son Teodoro González de León, Gustavo Lipkau y José Castillo.

Notable works
1999: Casa GGG, Mexico City
2000-2008 Casa La Atalaya, California
2002: Jose Vasconcelos Library, Mexico City 
2004: Casa Romany, California
2007-2010: Reforma 27 Tower, Mexico City

Design awards 
 1984: 2nd, 71st Paris prize bestowal of the art school in Columbus, Indiana
 1985: 3rd, international design competition for the museum of modern arts in Bonn, Germany
 1996: 1st, international design competition for the Petrosino Park, New York City (together with Ricardo Regazzoni and Julio González Rojas)
 1996: 1st, design competition of the Colegio Alemán Alexander von Humboldt in Puebla, Puebla (together with Felipe Buendía and Moises Miserachi)
 2004: 1st, international design competition for the José Vasconcelos Library (together with Juan Palomar, Gustavo Lipkau and Tonatiuh Martínez)

References

External links 
 
 Bilder der Werke von Alberto Kalach at ''praella.com
 
 Kalach's website

Mexican architects
People from Mexico City
Mexican people of Russian descent
1960 births
Living people